The Elgin Hotel, Darjeeling formerly known as The New Elgin was built around the year 1887 and was originally the summer residence of the Maharaja (King) of Cooch Behar. It is a Heritage Hotel situated in Darjeeling, a Hill Retreat in the Himalayas.

History
Built in 1887 around a garden, the hotel has been extensively refurbished to restore it to its former grandeur and its history has been kept intact. The hotel which was styled in the Royal Manor House architecture has been restored to its original condition with etchings of Gouray Douglas, lithographs of William Daniell, period Burma Teak furniture, oak floor boards and paneling and original fireplaces.

This hotel has played host to dignitaries like the US Ambassador and the Palden Thondup Namgyal, Crown Prince of Sikkim to Dominique Lapierre and Mark Tully. The hotel has stories to tell from the time of its first owner the Maharaja of Cooch Behar to Nancy Oakley when she owned it in the 1950s.

Awards
"Certificate of Excellence 2012" status by TripAdvisor

References

Heritage hotels in India
Hotels in Darjeeling
Hotel buildings completed in 1887